George D. Parker (1873-1937) was an American-born actor, writer and director who worked extensively in Australian theatre during the 1920s and 1930s, mostly for J.C. Williamson Ltd. He was later employed by Cinesound Productions as a dialogue director and screenwriter (in collaboration with Vic Roberts), as well as running the Cinesound Talent School with Frank Harvey. According to Hall, "Parker was much more slick in his handling of dialogue" than him around the time of The Silence of Dean Maitland but he did not work with Cinesound after Grandad Rudd.

Parker was working in radio just prior to his death.

Theatre
*Margery Daw (1916) Princess Theatre, New York – Playwright
Love Laughs (1919) Bijou Theatre, New York – Playwright

Filmography 
The Silence of Dean Maitland (1934) – dialogue director
Strike Me Lucky (1934) – co-writer, dialogue director
Cinesound Varieties (1934) – co-writer, dialogue director
Grandad Rudd (1935) – co-writer

References

External links 
 
 
 
 George D. Parker Australian theatre credits at AusStage

1873 births
1937 deaths
Australian screenwriters
20th-century Australian screenwriters
American emigrants to Australia